The Prince of Asturias Cup was an inter-regional football competition contested by the regional selections of Spain – selections of players from clubs from the region in question, meaning that players did not need to be native to the region. There have been seven tournaments for the Prince of Asturias Cup, the first of which was organized in 1915 by the national committee of the RFEF (Spanish FA) in honor of the donator of the trophy, don Alfonso, Prince of Asturias, the first-born son of King Alfonso XIII and Prince of Asturias.

The first editions (1914 to 1918) of the competition were held in Madrid and the registration of the regional federations was voluntary. At the end of the fourth edition, the competition was stopped due to a lack of interest, and the trophy was awarded to the Centro federation for winning two editions (1917 & 1918). In July 1922 it was agreed to introduce a new trophy called the Interregional Championship, which would be held on the road and with the mandatory participation of all regional federations associated with the Spanish FA. The high economic costs of travel again led to the disappearance of the competition, with a final tournament being played in 1926 with the aim of awarding ownership of the second trophy in dispute, and the champion was Catalonia.

The Prince of Asturias Cup is among the oldest Spanish football competitions along with the Copa de la Coronación and the Copa del Rey. Notable figures of this tournament are Santiago Bernabéu, Pichichi, Ricardo Zamora, Josep Samitier and Paulino Alcántara.

History
After its foundation on 1 September 1913, one of the first initiatives taken by the Royal Spanish Football Federation, was to promote the creation of a regional team championship that would serve as the first major "showcase" of Spanish football: To help spot the best players of the moment and consequently assemble a group of the players that made the best impression throughout the tournament to establish the bases for the formation of a Spanish team that could compete with other international teams. The idea had started a few months before the unification, when Juan Padrós Rubio (the 2nd official President of Real Madrid) held the federative presidency and Arcadio Padín, as a member of its Steering Committee, went to the Palace to request the Monarch Don Alfonso XIII the concession of a silver cup to be delivered to the winner, with the added promise that it would be the Infante Don Alfonso himself who would deliver it, and from that moment on, there's no stopping football from becoming the most popular and prestigious sport in Spain. Coincidence or not, just as Juan Padrós Rubio was the driving force behind the Prince of Asturias Cup, his brother, Carlos Padrós Rubio, was the driving force behind the Copa del Rey.

Prince of Asturias Cup I
The first edition of this competition was held from 10 to 14 May 1915 in Madrid, and more specifically in the fenced field that Atlético Madrid had between the streets of Narváez and O'Donnell. The new competition pitted the regional teams of Catalonia (which encompassed Barcelona, Lleida and Tarragona), Castile — under the denomination of the Centro team (which encompassed Madrid and the wider Castile region) — and Basque Country — under the denomination of Norte team (which encompassed Basque Country and Cantabria). The opening match between the Catalans and the Castilians was held on 10 May 1915, and was attended by his Majesty King Alfonso XIII, who chatted with the players during the break. The author of the competition's first-ever goal was Catalonia's Paulino Alcántara, who was only 18 years old at the time, and although Centro fought back and found an equalizer through René Petit, it was Catalonia who found the winner via Antonio Baró to beat the Centro team 2–1, with all the goals coming in the first half. Two days later the North team entered the fray, and they beat Catalonia with a solitary late goal from Juan Legarreta, despite the fact that Catalonia played better. Finally, the teams from the Center and the North met for the decisive game, and the Basques, who were playing without their biggest star Pichichi, managed to go ahead after the break with a goal from Patricio, but the hosts fought back and equalized shortly after courtesy of Santiago Bernabéu. René Petit missed a penalty that would have done justice to the Castilians' best game, and the miss was attributed to the fact that the field was not grass. In any case, the game was formidable and the draw was enough for the Basques to win the cup, although according to the press, they were not the best team. As for the top scorers, there was a six-fold tie at one goal as six different players scored all the goals of this first edition of the tournament. These accolades were also distributed among the three teams, as they all also finished tied at two goals each.

Results

Norte's line-up: Eizaguirre, Carrasco, Hurtado, Artola, Belauste I, Peña, Legarreta, Patricio, Belauste II, Pagaza and Echevarría (Pedro Barturen). 4 of these players, Belauste I, Belauste II and Echevarría, played for Athletic Bilbao at the 1915 Copa del Rey Final.

Centro's line-up: Pelous, Carruana, Beguiristain, Eulogio Aranguren, Feliciano Rey, Machimbarrena, Quintana, René Petit, Álvarez, Montero, Sotero Aranguren (Bernabéu).

Catalonia's line-up: Luis Bru, Reguera (Santiago Massana), Miguel Matifoll (Casellas), Torralba, Alfredo Massana, Alcántara, Monistrol, Mallorquí, Baró, Peris and Martínez (Kinké).

Prince of Asturias Cup II
The following year the competition was held in Madrid again, but this time it did not reach the sporting success and brilliance of the previous one. The title holders, the North Team, did not participate because they were unable to gather all their members due to disagreements that occurred within their own regional federation. Thus, the Catalan team and the central team were the ones appointed to dispute the title, despite the fact that the triangular format was established until the last moment. This new edition was played on the same venue as the previous one, with a double confrontation (due to the absence of the Basques) between both teams, the first of which was played on 11 May 1916 with a Catalan victory by 6–3, after showing total superiority over a disappointing local team. The star of the game was Francisco Cabedo, who scored the competition's first-ever (and only) hat-trick when he netted 4 goals past Centro's goalkeeper Juan de Cárcer, who was thus replaced by Joaquín Pascual for the second leg, which was much more competitive and with a slight local superiority, who found themselves 2–0 up with 20 minute to go, knowing that a win would force a play-off for the title, but Kinké wrecked Centro's hopes with a quick late brace that salvaged a 2–2 draw to the Catalans, meaning Catalonia won the trophy for the first time in their history.

Results

Because of the absence of the Northern team, a second match was played between Catalonia and Centro, elucidating the title to a two-legged final.

Catalonia's line-up was exactly the same for both games: Gibert; Pakán, Sampere, Salvó I; Casellas, Prat, Kinké, Monistrol; Cabedo, López and Raich. Four of these players, Gibert, Pakán, Sampere and López, played for Espanyol at the 1915 Copa del Rey Final.

Centro's line-ups: Cárcer (Pascual); Erice (La Serna), Carruana; E. Aranguren (Tejedor), René Petit (Castell), Quintana; Álvarez, Santiago Bernabéu, E. Uribarri (Pelous), Larrañaga and De Miguel. Four of these players, Erice, Petit, Álvarez and De Miguel, played for Madrid FC at the 1917 Copa del Rey Final.

Top Scorers

Prince of Asturias Cup III
The third edition of the tournament suffered again the absence of the Northern Team, whose Basque Football Federation was going through a convulsive period between the teams from Biscay and Gipuzkoa, culminating in a pivotal championship match between Athletic Bilbao (Biscay) and Real Sociedad (Gipuzkoa) being abandoned, and so, the recently created Federation of Cantabria took advantage of the absence of the Northern Team that was still in internal disputes, and sent its representation to Madrid to compete with Centro and Catalonia. The 1917 edition was wrapped in controversy because it was allowed to be played on the same day as the final of the 1917 Copa del Rey between Madrid FC and Arenas, which prevented the Central Team from having the players of Madrid FC, and thus, in order to assemble a team which could compete, they had to call-up the players from Athletic Madrid and Racing de Madrid, meaning they sent a weaker team with lesser-known players such as Racing's Pascual, Buylla, Zabala and Pablo De Miguel (the brother of Antonio, who had played and scored in the previous edition); and Atlético's Yañez, Miguel Mieg, Quintana, Agüero, and Saturno Villaverde, with the captain of this team being Madrid FC's only representative, José María Castell, and yet, against all odds, the "second options" managed to win the tournament for the first time in the team's history.

Centro and Catalonia opened the competition on 9 May 1917, also at O'Donnell's ground, and despite playing away from home, everyone was expecting a comfortable win for the Catalan side, but the Castilian team showed their worth and hold the huge favorites to a 2–2 draw, thanks to a brace from Saturno Villaverde. These two sides then both beat the Cantabrians, but while Catalonia did it with a tight 1–0 thanks to a lonely goal from Josep Gumbau, Centro surprised everyone when they found themselves leading 3–0 at the break with goals from captain Castell (pen.), Agüero and Villaverde, in an eventual 3–2 win (Centro's goalkeeper Joaquín Pascual scored an own goal, the competition's first and only, although Centro still won), meaning that a playoff match between the local team and Catalonia had to be played, as both were level on three points. The decisive clash was played at O'Donnell on the 15 May and Centro showed their quality once again by beating its rival 2–0, with second-half goals from Mieg and Agüero, thus winning the tournament, lifting the trophy, and matching the feats achieved by Norte and Catalonia in the previous two editions of the competition. However, the game, just like the tournament itself, was wrapped in controversy, because at 2–0 down, Catalonia had a goal from Monistrol disallowed in the 70th minute for having scored directly from a corner kick, a circumstance not allowed at the time, and that event led referee Julián Ruete to sent-off a visiting player (probably Artur Cella) due to the protests, to which the Catalan team left the match in protest. Atlético's Saturno Villaverde was the star of the tournament, being the top scorer with 3 goals - a brace against Catalonia in a 2–2 draw and the winner against Cantabria in a 3–2 win - thus going from an utter unknown of the masses to the tournament's surprise package and a loved hero in Madrid.

Results

Note: Some sources claim that both of Catalonia's goals were actually two first-half own goals from Centro's Yáñez.

Note: After the corresponding triangular format, a final playoff game had to be necessary since the Castilians and the Catalans were tied on three points after a draw and a victory each.

Centro's winning squad: Joaquín Pascual, José Luis de Goyarrola, Ricardo Naveda, José María Castell (Yáñez), Ezequiel Montero, Adolfo Buylla (Sócrates Quintana), Ignacio Zabala, José Agüero, Saturno Villaverde, Miguel Mieg (Pablo De Miguel) and Larrañaga (Ricardo Madariaga).

Top Scorers

Prince of Asturias Cup IV
After three editions of the Prince of Asturias Cup, the results had not met the expectations generated in the competition. The intransigence of the clubs to allow the transfer of their players meant that there were few federations that could gather a complete team to participate, and when this was achieved, it could not be said that it was made up of the best players in the region. On the other hand, the incompetence of some federative leaders and the calendar of the competition that allowed the 1917 edition to be played on the same day as the 1917 Copa del Rey Final between Madrid FC and Arenas - something that prevented the Central Team from having the best players of Madrid and the Basques would have left them without the contribution of their champions, the Arenas Club - had caused the tournament to lose the splendor of the first two editions. Furthermore, the idea of forming a national team to compete with other countries received a setback because of the global war that prevented international sports contacts. Thus, in January 1918, the clubs proposed to the National Federation the suppression of the competition, and this proposal was accepted in favor of a second category competition, since the tight schedule (in the previous edition the contest coincided with the final phase of the Copa del Rey) and controversies of another nature prevented the participation of the best players. Therefore, the edition that was held in Madrid between 20 and 23 January of that same year, was going to be the last in the first stage of this competition, and only the central team and the Cantabrian team participated, as they were the only ones that could put together a team with which to compete.

The Castilian team won the first leg 3–2 with goals from Sansinenea, Gomar and Feliciano Rey, while the away goals were scored by the Villaverde brothers, Senén and Fernando, with the former netting one more in the second leg in yet another loss as Centro won 3–1 thanks to a brace from Ramón Olalquiaga, who had not played the first leg. Both games were dominated by the Centro side, with special mention to Cárcer, Machim, Gomar, who trotted a lot, and De Miguel and Sansinenea, who, although obsessed with doing everything by themselves, played brilliantly. The 6–3 aggregate win meant Centro was proclaimed champions again, thus becoming the last winners of the competition's first stage as well as the first team to win the cup twice, doing so in consecutive editions, although the 1918 games sparked little interest in the fans.

Results

Top Scorers

Resurgence
Two years later, the Spanish national team made its official debut at the 1920 Olympic Games in Antwerp, and despite being their first-ever taste of an international major tournament they still managed to win the silver medal. Notably, the author of Spain's first-ever goal, Patricio, also scored in the first tournament of the Prince of Asturias Cup in 1915. This good run by the Spanish side increased football's popularity in the country, and to defend the success achieved and prepare the Spanish team for the next Olympic Games in 1924, the Spanish FA agreed on 20 July 1922, to reestablish the Prince of Asturias Cup (under the name Campeonato Interregional) as the basis for the composition of the national team, in order to facilitate the selection of players for the team. This time with the obligatory participation by all member regions on the Spanish mainland. Once again the proposal got an excellent reception among the clubs and the fans. Matches were now played at different venues, but due to logistic and financial problems, it was decided to stop the competition after the third edition, which was played between the winners of the first two with the sole objective of deciding which region obtained the cup to keep.

Prince of Asturias Cup V

The first edition of the revived tournament (and fifth overall) was won by Asturias after beating the tournament's surprise package Galicia in the final 3–1, courtesy of a second-half brace from José Luis Zabala, who was the star of the tournament and its top scorer with 5 goals, including a last-minute winner against Catalonia in the semi-finals.

Prince of Asturias Cup VI

The second edition of the revived tournament (and sixth overall) was won by Catalonia after beating Centro 3–2 in the replay of the final, after the original game finished in a dramatic 4–4 draw thanks to a last-minute equalizer from Emili Sagi-Barba. The top scorer of the tournament was Centro's Juan Monjardín with 5 goals, of which three came in the final, scoring twice in a 2–3 loss to Catalonia in the replay. Josep Samitier also scored three goals in the final, and despite having failed to net in any other game, he still got the "silver boot".

The sixth edition of this competition did not achieve the success of the previous one and failed to serve as the basis for forming the Spanish squad for the 1924 Summer Olympics and after the Spanish failure in Paris, the Prince of Asturias Cup ended up being definitively abolished by the Spanish FA on 26 June 1924.

Prince of Asturias Cup VII
The last edition of this Inter-regional tournament was played several months later, in September 1926, between the previous two champions, Asturias and Catalonia, for the right to keep the trophy. On 5 September 1926, the first leg of this ultimate final was played in El Molinón, ending in a 2–0 win for the Catalans, with both goals being scored by Domingo Broto. On the 19th of the same month at the Camp del Guinardó, the second leg was held, and Asturias only needed 5 minutes to score the opening goal against the local team, thus setting the scene for an incredible comeback at Barcelona, but Forgas killed off their momentum with an equalizer just 5 minutes later, which no longer moved until the break. After the break, the Catalans' game improved, and through Pellicer, Alcántara and Forgas they put the score in a clear 4–1, being Herrera who, with two goals in the last five minutes, closed the gap and established the final result, another Catalan victory by 4–3. With this win, Catalonia remained in the property of the Prince of Asturias Cup trophy.

Results

Asturian side: Benjamín; Quirós, Trucha; Justo, Menéndez, Corsino; Domingo, Morilla, Herrera, Avilesu and Molinuco.

Catalonia side: Pedret; Serra, Montané; Tena I, Pelaó, Mauricio; Piera, Samitier, Sastre, Broto and Sagi-Barba.

Catalonia side: Pedret; Serra, Massague; Soligo, Pelaó, Tena I; Pellicer, Broto, Forgas, Alcántara and Sagi-Barba. 3 of these players, Serra, Pelaó and Pellicer, played for CE Europa at the 1923 Copa del Rey Final.

Asturias side: Benjamín; Quirós, Cuesta; Bango, Menéndez, Corsino; Matón, Avilesu, Herrera, Braulio and Argüelles (Quirós being replaced by Nico and Benjamín by Picú during the match).

Top Scorers

List of winners

Most successful teams

Records and statistics

Top scorers per tournament

Most goals in a single tournament

All-time top goalscorers

Notable figures with two goals include Santiago Bernabéu (1 goal in 1915 and 1916), René Petit (1 goal in 1915 and 1923–24), Paulino Alcántara (1 goal in 1915 and 1926), Ramón Polo Pardo (2 goals in 1922-23), Cristóbal Martí (1 goal in 1922–23 and 1923–24) and Vicente Piera (2 goals in 1923–24).

Hat-tricks
From the first official tournament in 1915, until its last 11 years later, only one hat-trick was scored, and curiously, it was actually a poker. The first and last treble of the Prince of Asturias Cup was scored by Francisco Cabedo on 11 May 1916 in the second edition of the competition in a game between fierce rivals Catalonia and the Centro team, with the former winning 6-3, and interestingly, this is the only game in the competition's history in which a team scored at least 5 goals. Oddly, this was the only time Cabedo found the back of the net in the Prince of Asturias Cup, but despite that his 4-goal haul alone makes him one of the all-time top goal scorer in the competition's history. It's also worth mentioning that some reports list José Luis Zabala as the author of the opening goal of the 1922–23 final on 25 February 1923, which together with his second-half brace makes for another hat-trick in the competition, and one that handed Asturias a 3-1 win over Galicia at Coia.

Braces
Zabala and Monjardín, the competition's top scorers, also hold the record for the most braces, with two each. Cubells, Monjardín and Herrera are the only ones to have scored a brace for a losing side.

Ramón Herrera scored the fastest brace in the competition with 2 goals in 2 minutes, while Josep Samitier's brace needed 3 minutes to be completed. Kinké also scored a very quick brace of around 5 minutes.

Rogelio Barril is the only one to have scored a brace in extra-time with goals in the 125th and 144th.

Other goalscoring records
Although the competition failed to serve as the bases for the formation of a Spanish team, many of the players who participated in this inter-regional competition earned caps for Spain, in fact, a total of 11 players have managed to score at both the Prince of Asturias Cup and at international level for Spain: Patricio, Domingo Acedo, Paulino Alcántara, Manuel Meana, Travieso, Vicente Piera, Juan Monjardín, José Luis Zabala, Josep Samitier, Carmelo and Eduardo Cubells, with Patricio and Alcántara being the only ones who scored in the first phase of the Prince of Asturias Cup (1915–18). Only 5 players have managed to score multiple goals on both sides: Alcántara (2/6), Travieso (3/2), Monjardín (6/3), Zabala (6/4) and Samitier (4/2).

The only players to have scored in both phases of the Prince of Asturias Cup are Paulino Alcántara (1915 and 1926), Antonio De Miguel (1916 and 1923–24) and Kinké (1916 and 1922–23/1923–24).

Other records
Eulogio Aranguren and Enrique Peris hold the peculiar distinction of being the only ones to have participated in the Prince of Asturias Cup as both a player and referee: Both of them played in the first edition of the competition with Centro and Catalonia respectively, and then, both refereed one quarter-final in the 1922–23 edition.

Joaquín Pascual holds the unwanted distinction of being the only player to have scored an own goal in the competition. He was Centro's goalkeeper and in a game against Cantabric on 11 May 1917, he netted an own goal under unknown circumstances, fortunately, his side managed to hold on to a 3–2 win.

Legacy
The Prince of Asturias Cup was one of the tournaments that left the most pleasant and lasting memory in the fans, with the added passion of the public for the always latent Hispanic regionalism, however, the selfishness of the clubs and local quarrels did not allow the tournament to take root in Spain. If the cup had persevered and kept its original purpose, the tournament would have grown to become one of the most brilliant events on the Spanish football calendar.

Notes

See also
UEFA Regions' Cup

References

External links
 Spain - Copa Príncipe de Asturias/Campeonato Interregional RSSSF archives

Defunct football competitions in Spain
 P
Recurring sporting events established in 1915
Recurring sporting events disestablished in 1926
1915 establishments in Spain
1926 disestablishments in Spain